Alexis André Jr. (born 31 May 1997) is a French-born professional footballer and social media personality of Moroccan descent. He plays as a goalkeeper for Maidenhead United.

Career

Early career
André was an unused substitute for Championnat National 3 side Schiltigheim seven times during the 2014-2015 season. He then went to have a spell with the Nike Academy.

Bristol Rovers
On 2 July 2017 André was handed a trial at League One club Bristol Rovers. After a successful trial period with the club, André was signed by Rovers.

Following a broken hand from first choice goalkeeper Adam Smith, Sam Slocombe went in goal with André taking his place on the bench for the first time against Bury. André remained on the bench and on 9 September 2017, starting goalkeeper Slocombe saw red for a professional foul in the 60th minute against Walsall with the teams tied at 1–1. André came on, saving the resultant free kick, before producing a number of saves as Rovers scored in the 87' minute, winning 2–1.

At the end of the 2018–19 season, Bristol Rovers exercised a contract extension for him. At the end of the 2020–21 season, André was one of thirteen players to be leaving the club at the end of their contract.

Loan Spells
On 23 November 2017 André joined Paulton Rovers on a one-month loan. On 31 January 2018, he moved out on loan again, this time joining Tiverton Town on a one-month loan deal. On 20 February 2019, André joined Yate Town on a one-month loan deal.

In March 2019, he joined Truro City on loan.

Salisbury (loan)
On 21 October 2020, André joined Salisbury on loan until 9 January 2021. He made his debut three days later in a 6-1 away victory at Dorchester Town.

Folkestone Invicta
Following his release from Bristol Rovers, André joined Isthmian Premier Division side Folkestone Invicta, making his debut on 2 October 2021 as his new side caused an FA Cup upset to knock out Gloucester City.

Dover Athletic
On 27 November 2021, André was announced to have joined National League bottom side Dover Athletic. He made his debut on 28 December in a 3–2 defeat away at Woking. Following relegation, manager Andy Hessenthaler confirmed that the club intended to retain the goalkeeper however in June 2022 conceded that the club were unlikely to be able to get the money together.

Maidenhead United
On 3 July 2022, André returned to the National League to join Maidenhead United. André had to wait until 29 October to make his first-team debut for the club, impressing in a 1–0 home victory over Bromley that earned the goalkeeper a place in the National League Team of the Week.

International career
André is eligible to represent France national football team, Guadeloupe national football team and Morocco national football team at senior level. On 1 October 2018, André was called up to the Morocco under-23 squad for their friendlies against Algeria and Senegal. André appeared twice as an unused substitute against Algeria.

Personal life
André was born in France to a French father of Guadelopean descent and a Moroccan mother. After his birth, his parents separated and Alexis was raised by his father. 

André has a TikTok account that has amassed a following of almost four million as of May 2022. In May 2022, he appeared on the Amazon Prime Video dating show Lovestruck High.

Career statistics

References

1997 births
Living people
French sportspeople of Moroccan descent
French people of Guadeloupean descent
TikTokers
Moroccan footballers
French footballers
French expatriate footballers
Moroccan expatriate footballers
Association football goalkeepers
SC Schiltigheim players
Bristol Rovers F.C. players
Truro City F.C. players
Nike Academy players
Tiverton Town F.C. players
Salisbury F.C. players
Paulton Rovers F.C. players
Yate Town F.C. players
Folkestone Invicta F.C. players
Dover Athletic F.C. players
Maidenhead United F.C. players
English Football League players
Southern Football League players
National League (English football) players
Isthmian League players
Expatriate footballers in England
French expatriate sportspeople in England
Moroccan expatriate sportspeople in England